F. A. Forbes (16 March 1869 – 1936) was the pen name of Mother Frances Alice Monica Forbes, RSCJ, a member of the Society of the Sacred Heart from Scotland and a religious author.

Biography
She was born in 1869 as Alice Forbes into a Presbyterian family. Her mother died when she was a child. In 1900 she became a Roman Catholic. Only a few months later, she entered the Society of the Sacred Heart, as a 31-year-old postulant.

She wrote numerous books, including brief biographies of Ignatius Loyola, John Bosco, Teresa of Ávila, Columba, Monica, Athanasius, Catherine of Siena, Benedict of Nursia, Hugh of Lincoln, Vincent de Paul, and, most famously, Pope Pius X. She died in 1936.

Bibliography
Saint Ignatius Loyola
Saint Teresa of Ávila
Life of St. Vincent de Paul
Saint Athanasius: The Father of Orthodoxy (1919)
Saint John Bosco
Saint Columba
Saint Monica
Saint Catherine of Siena
Saint Benedict
Saint Hugh of Lincoln
Pope Saint Pius X

Writings
 "About the Author", Saint Teresa of Ávila, by F. A. Forbes, TAN Books and Publishers, Inc, 1917

External links
 
  
 

1869 births
1936 deaths
Converts to Roman Catholicism from Presbyterianism
British Roman Catholic writers
Scottish Roman Catholic religious sisters and nuns
Scottish biographers
Place of birth missing
Place of death missing
20th-century British Roman Catholic nuns